Badja Station is a pastoral lease that operates as a sheep station in Western Australia.

The station was established at some time prior to 1897. In 1897 Badja was operating as a cattle station. The lessee, John Morrissey, died and approximately 1,400 cattle were put up for sale.

Edward Wittenoom owned both Badja and nearby Hinton Station in 1909, both of which were being operated as sheep stations.

Gindalbie Metals, an iron ore miner, proposed to turn part of its operations at Badja into a national radioactive waste management facility in 2015. The station was the subject of a native title claim by Aboriginal Australians, the Widi people, at the time.

See also
List of ranches and stations
List of pastoral leases in Western Australia

References

Pastoral leases in Western Australia
Stations (Australian agriculture)
Homesteads in Western Australia
Mid West (Western Australia)